The 2010 Habikino shooting was a deadly spree shooting which occurred at a drinking establishment located just south of Eganoshō Station in Habikino, Osaka Prefecture, Japan on 12 January 2010.

The attack was carried out by 49-year-old Yasuhisa Sugiura. Three people, including the gunman's mother-in-law, were shot dead before the perpetrator committed suicide.

Shooting incidents such as these are rare in Japan.

The perpetrator
Yasuhisa Sugiura, 49, was a government employee in Japan's second-largest city Osaka. According to police, he was involved in a "troubled marriage" with a 48-year-old woman.

Shooting
On 12 January 2010, Sugiura went to the Ii-chan bar to discuss a divorce with his mother-in-law, 66-year-old Yoshiko Tanaka, who would subsequently become one of his victims. The bar was open for business and had other customers inside; Sugiura's wife was possibly one of them. Sugiura then departed. Sugiura came back armed with a rifle and opened fire at approximately 20:00 that evening, killing three people. Two of Sugiura's targets — the mother-in-law and a 23-year-old bar employee named Tatsuya Fukui — died immediately; a third, 49-year-old bar landlord Hiroto Uehara, died shortly thereafter. Witnesses described the rifle shots as "three or four blunt bangs"; a pool of blood was left in front of the bar.

Sugiura then exited the bar and shot himself in the abdomen, killing himself.

References

2010 murders in Japan
January 2010 crimes
Deaths by firearm in Japan
Murder in Japan
Murder–suicides in Japan
Habikino
Mass shootings in Japan
Suicides by firearm in Japan
2010 murders in Asia
2010 mass shootings in Asia